Rowgir-e Hajji Mohammad Taqi (also Romanized as Rūgīr-e Ḩājjī Moḩammad Taqī; also known as Rowgir-e Rashidi) is a village in Kheyrgu Rural District, Alamarvdasht District, Lamerd County, Fars Province, Iran. At the 2006 census, its population was 199, in 44 families.

References 

Populated places in Lamerd County